A report is an informational work, such as a document or speech.

Report may also refer to:

Arts, entertainment, and media
The Report (1977 film), an Iranian film
The Report (2019 film), a drama film
Report (film), a 1967 art film
Report (newsmagazine), a Canadian news magazine
Report (TV series), a journalistic TV program in Italy
Report Canada, a 1978 Canadian television series

Education 
Report (punishment)
Report card

Health care
Report (nursing), the exchange of information between nursing staff members at change of shift
Incident report

Other uses
Report (noise), the sound of a gun firing, or a firework exploding
Reports, simple non-inferential passages